Russian True Orthodox Church may refer to:

Catacomb Church
True Russian Orthodox Church
Russian True Orthodox Church (Lazar Zhurbenko)